Fred Kaplan (born 1937) is distinguished Professor Emeritus of English at Queens College and the Graduate Center of the City University of New York.

Biography
He was born in 1937 in The Bronx, New York, and attended  Lafayette High School and Brooklyn College.

Books
He is the author of several biographies.  
His book Thomas Carlyle was a finalist for the National Book Critics Circle Award,  and the Pulitzer Prize.

 
 John Quincy Adams: American Visionary, HarperCollins, 2014, 
  
 
 Gore Vidal: A Biography Doubleday, 1999, ; Bloomsbury Publishing, 2012,  
 ; Taylor & Francis US, 1999,  
 Dickens: A Biography, William Morrow & Company, 1988, 
 Sacred tears: sentimentality in Victorian literature, Princeton University Press, 1987,  
 Thomas Carlyle: A Biography, Cornell University Press, 1983, ; University of California Press, 1993,  
 Dickens and mesmerism: the hidden springs of fiction, Princeton University Press, 1975, 
 John Elliotson on Mesmerism, Da Capo Press, (New York), 1982.

References

External links 
 Behind the Book interview

1937 births
American biographers
American male biographers
Graduate Center, CUNY faculty
Queens College, City University of New York faculty
Brooklyn College alumni
Living people
Lafayette High School (New York City) alumni
Historians from New York (state)